Nives Curti (born 1 September 1969) is a former Italian female long-distance runner and mountain runner who competed at individual senior level at the IAAF World Women's Road Race Championships and at the IAAF World Cross Country Championships (2001, 2002).

Biography
She won several medals at the World and European championships in the mountain running, three of these at individual level.

Achievements

National titles
She won four national championships at individual senior level.
Italian Cross Country Championships
Long race: 1989
Italian Mountain Running Championships
Individual: 1993, 1994, 1995

See also
 Italy at the European Mountain Running Championships

References

External links
 

1969 births
Living people
Italian female long-distance runners
Italian female cross country runners
Italian female marathon runners
Italian female mountain runners
20th-century Italian women
21st-century Italian women